Er Roseires  is a town in eastern Sudan 60 km from the border with Ethiopia.

Lord Prudhoe mentions this town in the 1829 diary he kept while travelling in the Sennar. At the time it was the residence of one Sheikh Suliman, ruler of the lower reach of the Blue Nile (Baḥr al-Azraq), for which he paid 1500 ounces of gold to the Egyptians out of his revenues.

The Roseires Dam is located just upstream of the town.

Climate 
El Roseires features a Tropical Savanna Climate ( Aw )

References 

Populated places in Blue Nile (state)